Steinar Bragi (full name: Steinar Bragi Guðmundsson) is an Icelandic writer born 15 August 1975. He has been called 'Iceland's foremost contemporary author, in the estimation of many'.

Career

At the age of 23 he published his first book of poetry, Svarthol, and his first novel, Turninn ('the tower'), was published in 2000. He studied comparative literature and philosophy at the University of Iceland. In 2008, his book Konur ('Women') received great critical and commercial success and was nominated for the Nordic Council literature prize. Current affairs, particularly the 2008–11 Icelandic financial crisis, are prominent in his work from 2008 onwards, such as Konur and Hálendið: Skáldsaga. Steinar Bragi is sometimes considered to be in the "new wave" of younger Icelandic authors influenced by popular culture and in his case the grotesque, with influences from horror writers such as H. P. Lovecraft. He is also notable as a poet.

Most of Steinar Bragi's early writing was published by the Icelandic publishing house Bjartur. In 2008, however, he changed to Mál og menning. During the transition, his novel Konur was accordingly first published by the avante-garde collective Nýhil before being republished by Mál og menning.

Works
Svarthol (Black Hole), poems, Nykur, 1998
Augnkúluvökvi (Eyeball liquid), poems, Nykur, 1999
Turninn (The Tower), prose, Bjartur, 2000
Ljúgðu gosi, ljúgðu (Lie Pinocchio, lie), poems, Bjartur, 2001,
Áhyggjudúkkur (Worrydolls), novel, Bjartur, 2002
"Draumar um bin Laden" (Dreams of bin Laden), play, On War, Nýhil, 2003
Sólskinsfólkið (The Sunshine People), novel, Bjartur, 2004
Litli kall strikes again (Little guy strikes again), prose, Nýhil, 2005
Útgönguleiðir (Exits), prose, Nýhil, 2005
Hið stórfenglega leyndarmál Heimsins (The Magnificent Secret of The World), novel, Bjartur, 2006
Konur (Women), novel, Nýhil, 2008; 2nd edn Mál og Menning, 2009
Himinninn yfir Þingvöllum: Þrjár sögur (The sky over Þingvellir: three stories), novel, Mál og menning, 2009
Hálendið: Skáldsaga (The Highlands), novel, Mál og mennings, 2011
Reimleikar í Reykjavík (The Haunting of Reykjavík), JPV, 2013
Kata (Katie), novel, Mál og menning, 2014

References

External links
Book of the month: Women
Forlagið publisher
Nordic literature

1975 births
Steinar Bragi
Living people